The Northeast Frontier Railway (abbreviated NFR) is one of the 19 railway zones of the Indian Railways. It is headquartered in Maligaon, Guwahati in the state of Assam, and responsible for operation and expansion of rail network all across Northeastern states and some districts of eastern Bihar and northern West Bengal.

Divisions
Northeast Frontier Railway is divided into 5 divisions:
 Katihar railway division
 Alipurduar railway division
 Lumding railway division
 Rangiya railway division
 Tinsukia railway division
Each of these divisions is headed by a Divisional Railway Manager, a Senior Administrative Grade officer of the rank of Joint Secretary to Government of India.
The departmental setup at headquarters level and divisional setup in the field assists the General Manager in running the railways. Various departments namely engineering, mechanical, electrical, signal & telecom, operations, commercial, safety, accounts, security, personal and medical are headed by a Senior Administrative Grade / Higher Administrative Grade officer, provide technical and operational support to the divisions in train operations. Another division is being to be set up in Silchar by bifurcating Lumding division.

History

This company later started the first passenger train in Assam by the name of Dibru–Sadiya Railway.
The North Eastern Railway was formed on 14 April 1952 by amalgamating two railway systems: the Assam Railway and Oudh and Tirhut Railway. Later, it was bifurcated into two railway zones on 15 January 1958, the North Eastern Railway and the Northeast Frontier Railway. to better serve the needs of the northeastern states.

Operational area

The area of Northeast Frontier Railway operations is characterized by exceptional beauty and at the same time by some of the most arduous terrain. This difficult terrain limits the rail network expansion, and the only state with a decent rail network is Assam. Before the Saraighat Bridge was constructed, passengers had to get down on the Amingaon side of the Brahmaputra and take a ferry across to Pandu Junction from where they could resume their journey.
The majority of the tracks have been converted to BG and electrification is in process starting from Katihar till Guwahati.

Major sections
A few of the major sections under the Northeast Frontier Railway zone are:
Eklakhi–Balurghat branch line
New Bongaigaon–Guwahati section
New Jalpaiguri–New Bongaigaon section
Rangiya–Murkongselek section
Guwahati–Lumding section
Lumding–Dibrugarh section
Silchar–Sabroom section
Katihar–Siliguri section
Katihar–Jogbani branch line
Alipurduar–Bamanhat branch line
New Jalpaiguri–Alipurduar–Samuktala Road line
Barauni–Guwahati line

Darjeeling Himalayan Railway

The Darjeeling Himalayan Railway is maintained and governed under the responsibility of Katihar division. It ascends  from New Jalpaiguri; the climb begins at Sukna, continues uninterruptedly to Ghum and descends the final  to Darjeeling. After independence, India's partition resulted in the isolation of the Northeast region. Consequently, the DHR was merged into Assam Railways, it was closed for the construction of the Assam–Bengal link line and one of its extension lines to Kishanganj was converted to metre gauge. DHR's other extension line to Kalimpong was washed away due to floods. On reopening, the DHR was merged with North Eastern Railway in 1952 and later into Northeast Frontier Railway in 1958.

The DHR achieved worldwide fame for many reasons such as:

 A gateway to the Himalayas
 The tiny four-wheeled steam locomotives of the 19th century
 The curves, loops, "Z"s and steep grades crisscrossing the road

An interest in DHR all along has ensured that it continues to operate notwithstanding very heavy losses. The steam locomotive is an icon of this Railway. Tindharia workshop has kept 13 locomotives surviving, some of which are over 100 years old and the youngest is about 70 years old.

Timeline of DHR:

 20 January 1948: Purchased by the Government of India
 26 January 1948: Transferred to Assam Rail Link
 26 January 1950: Transferred to Assam Railway
 14 January 1952: Transferred to North Eastern Railway
 15 January 1958: Transferred to Northeast Frontier Railway

Major Trains

Dibrugarh Rajdhani Express
Dibrugarh-Kanyakumari Vivek Express
Avadh Assam Express
Agartala Rajdhani Express
Bangalore Humsafar Express
Agartala - Firozpur Tripura Sundari Express
Aronai Superfast Express
Dibrugarh-Chandigarh Express
Dibrugarh-Amritsar Express
Dwarka Express
Amarnath Express
Kamakhya–Shri Mata Vaishno Devi Katra Express
Kamakhya - Lokmanya Tilak Terminus Karmabhoomi Express
Kamakhya - Udaipur City Kavi Guru Express
Kamakhya - Dr. Ambedkar Nagar Express
Kamakhya–Gandhidham Superfast Express
Dibrugarh– Chennai Tambaram Express
Dibrugarh - Mumbai LTT Express

Loco sheds
 Diesel Loco Shed, Siliguri
 Diesel & Electric Loco Shed, Malda Town
 Diesel Loco Shed, New Guwahati 
 Diesel Loco Shed, Mariani

Sicklines & Pitlines

 Dibrugarh Coaching Depot, Dibrugarh
 Pitline, Dibrugarh
 N.F.Railway Mechanical Workshop, Dibrugarh
 Coach Maintenance Depot/Sickline, Guwahati
 Pitline, Guwahati
 Pitline, New Guwahati
 New Bongaigaon Carriage & Wagon Workshop, New Bongaigaon
 Coach Maintenance Depot, Kamakhya
 Automatic Coach Washing Pitline, Kamakhya
 Silchar Coaching Depot, Silchar
 Pitline, Silchar
 DEMU cum Sick Shed, Agartala
 Pitline, Agartala
 Routine Overhaul(ROH) Depot, New Tinsukia
 Tinsukia Carriage Depot, Tinsukia

Major stations
These are the major railway station which have large numbers of passenger frequencies and stoppages of trains in the zone.

See also
 All India Station Masters' Association
 Zones and divisions of Indian Railways
 Northeast Frontier Railway Stadium

Further reading

References

External links
 Northeast Frontier Railway
 Indian Railways Online (official site)
 Indian Railways Fan Club
 IR. Online Tickets
 N F Railway (construction)
 Northeast Frontier Railway Recruitment

N

Rail transport in Assam
Transport in Guwahati
Economy of Guwahati